Melville is an unincorporated community in Logan County, West Virginia, United States. The community of Melville was established in 1967.

Mining accident
Melville is the location of the Aracoma Alma Mine No. 1 that caught fire on January 19, 2006 killing two miners. Melville's Bright Star Freewill Baptist Church served as the location for dissemination of information during the search for the miners and as a place for families and friends to keep vigil.

References

Unincorporated communities in Logan County, West Virginia
Unincorporated communities in West Virginia
Mining communities in West Virginia
Coal towns in West Virginia